German Gilberto Armas, known as Gilberto Aleman (1931–2011) was a Spanish author and journalist, working in the Canary Islands.

Career 
Aleman was a part-time editor of La Leaf on Mondays from 1960 to 1979. The following year, he became chief editor of La Tarde, and retained this position until 1982.

Books 

 El Canto Del Mirlo, 1984
 Café el Aguila,1992
 Vuelos históricos en Tenerife,1993
 El carnaval, la fiesta prohibida,1996
 Episodios republicanos,1997
 Molinos de viento,1998
 Cuando vienes del campo, 2001
 La Banda Municipal, 2003
 Anaga, 2009

Awards 
 Canarias de Comunicación Prize (1995)
 Awards in recognition for journalism (2008) – Federation of Associations of Journalists of Spain (FAPE)

References 

1931 births
2011 deaths
20th-century male writers
Spanish writers
Writers from the Canary Islands
People from San Cristóbal de La Laguna